Mason Unck (born March 3, 1980) was a linebacker for the Cleveland Browns from 2003–2006. He played college football at Arizona State University. He played primarily as a special teams player. He is currently a free agent.

Early years
Unck was born in Ogden, Utah, where he attended Bonneville High School and was a letterman in football and basketball.

References

1980 births
Living people
Sportspeople from Ogden, Utah
American football linebackers
Arizona State Sun Devils football players
Cleveland Browns players
Frankfurt Galaxy players
Players of American football from Utah
American expatriate sportspeople in Germany